Iftikhar Ahmed Syed (born 23 August 1952) is a Pakistani field hockey player. He competed at the 1972 Summer Olympics and the 1976 Summer Olympics, winning a silver and bronze medal respectively.

References

External links
 

1952 births
Living people
Pakistani male field hockey players
Olympic field hockey players of Pakistan
Field hockey players at the 1972 Summer Olympics
Field hockey players at the 1976 Summer Olympics
Olympic silver medalists for Pakistan
Olympic bronze medalists for Pakistan
Olympic medalists in field hockey
Medalists at the 1972 Summer Olympics
Medalists at the 1976 Summer Olympics
Place of birth missing (living people)
Asian Games medalists in field hockey
Asian Games gold medalists for Pakistan
Medalists at the 1974 Asian Games
Field hockey players at the 1974 Asian Games
20th-century Pakistani people